Trouble is a 2017 American independent comedy-drama film written and directed by Theresa Rebeck and starring Anjelica Huston, Bill Pullman and David Morse.  Huston serves as one of the executive producers of the film.

Plot

Cast
Anjelica Huston as Maggie
Bill Pullman as Ben
David Morse as Gerry
Julia Stiles as Rachel
Brian d'Arcy James as Logan
Jim Parrack as Curt
Victor Williams as Ray

Release and reception
The film made its worldwide premiere at the Seattle International Film Festival.

John DeFore of The Hollywood Reporter gave the film a positive review and wrote that "the cast goes a long way here, turning Trouble at times into the kind of small-town hangout film that will please [festival audiences]."

References

External links
 
 

American independent films
American comedy-drama films
Films about siblings
2010s English-language films
2010s American films